Massachusetts elected its members November 3, 1806.

See also 
 Massachusetts's 12th congressional district special election, 1807
 United States House of Representatives elections, 1806 and 1807
 List of United States representatives from Massachusetts

Notes 

1806
Massachusetts
United States House of Representatives